The 1970 Gediz earthquake (also known as the 1970 Kütahya-Gediz earthquake) struck western Turkey on 28 March at about 23:02 local time, with an estimated magnitude of 7.2 on the  scale.

Many people were burned alive as fires broke out from overturned stoves, and 9,452 buildings in the region were severely damaged or destroyed.

The residents moved in their newly built, earthquake-resistant homes. Neighboring towns and villages were also rebuilt at places with relative minimum earthquake risk.

Other major earthquakes occurred in Gediz in 1866 and 1896, and on June 25, 1944, at 07:20 local time, a magnitude 6.0 earthquake occurred in Gediz, killing 20 people and damaging around 3,500 buildings.

See also 
 List of earthquakes in 1970
 List of earthquakes in Turkey

References

External links 

1970 Gediz
1970 in Turkey
1970 earthquakes
History of Kütahya Province
March 1970 events in Europe
1970 disasters in Turkey